Aygavan is a village in the Vedi Municipality of the Ararat Province of Armenia, located on the Yerevan-Meghri highway, near the Yerevan-Nakhchivan railway, at a height of 840 meters above sea level.

Etymology 
The village is also known as Aygevan.

History 
Archaeologists have uncovered various antiquities around the village dated between 10 BCE and 8 BCE, such as clay pots and livestock of the early farmers of the area. The village was founded in 1828 and renamed Aygavan on April 4, 1946, when the Armenian SSR signed a decree to officially rename the village.

Culture 

Aygavan has a middle school, a public library, a house of culture, an outpatient clinic and a post office.

Industry 
Aygavan has a wine factory that is a branch of Ararat Brandy. Its main headquarters are in Yerevan, and it has branches in three other areas in Armenia, in Aygavan, Armavir, and in Tavush, and produces the world’s number one exported Armenian brandy, ranked in the top 5 of imported brandies worldwide.

Demographics 
According to the 2017 official census, Aygavan has a population of 4,569, all Armenians, up from 3,914 in the 2011 census.

Gallery

References

External links 

Report of the results of the 2001 Armenian Census

Populated places in Ararat Province